Pozzaglio ed Uniti is a comune (municipality) in the Province of Cremona in the Italian region Lombardy, located about  southeast of Milan and about  north of Cremona.

Pozzaglio ed Uniti borders the following municipalities: Casalbuttano ed Uniti, Castelverde, Corte de' Frati, Olmeneta, Persico Dosimo, Robecco d'Oglio.

Religion

Churches
San Lorenzo

References

Cities and towns in Lombardy